American Football Association may refer to:
 American Football Association (1884–1924), the first attempt in the United States to form an organizing association football body
 American Football Association (1977–1983), a minor professional American football league
 American Football Association (organization), a sanctioning body for semi-pro American football and organizer of the Semi-Pro Football Hall of Fame, in which Jerry Kurz, Kenny Washington and Ray Seals are members